Slobozia Moară is a commune in Dâmbovița County, Muntenia, Romania with a population of 2,320 people. It is composed of a single village, Slobozia Moară.

References

Communes in Dâmbovița County
Localities in Muntenia